William Jolliffe (16 April 1745 – 20 February 1802) was a British politician who sat in the House of Commons  from 1768 to 1802.

Life
He was the eldest son of the politician John Jolliffe and his wife Mary, daughter of Samuel Holden. He was educated at Winchester College and Brasenose College, Oxford.

Jolliffe was elected as Member of Parliament for Petersfield in 1768, a seat controlled by his father, who died in 1771 leaving him a sitting patron. He held it until 1802.
He was a Lord of Trade from 1772 to 1779 and Lord of the Admiralty during 1783.

He bought the lease for his residence on King Street in 1772 for what he called "very cheap," but Edward Gibbon described the place as "excellent." After his death, his son Hylton sold it to Henry Francis Greville, who opened it as the Argyll Rooms.

Family
He married Eleanor Hylton, daughter and heir of Sir Richard Hylton, 5th Baronet, and Anne, sister and co-heiress of John Hylton, de jure 18th Baron Hylton. Jolliffe died in February 1802, aged 56, after falling through a trapdoor into a cellar at his home. His wife died the same year. Their grandson William George Hylton Jolliffe became a prominent Conservative politician and was created Baron Hylton in 1866.

Notes

References
Kidd, Charles, Williamson, David (editors). Debrett's Peerage and Baronetage (1990 edition). New York: St Martin's Press, 1990, 

1745 births
1802 deaths
People educated at Winchester College
Alumni of Brasenose College, Oxford
Members of the Parliament of Great Britain for English constituencies
British MPs 1768–1774
British MPs 1774–1780
British MPs 1780–1784
British MPs 1784–1790
British MPs 1790–1796
British MPs 1796–1800
Members of the Parliament of the United Kingdom for English constituencies
UK MPs 1801–1802
Lords of the Admiralty
William